P. bolivari may refer to:

Phymateus bolivari, a species of grasshopper
Pseudocellus bolivari, an arachnid species found in Mexico